The 2014 V8SuperTourer season was a motor racing championship for touring cars held in New Zealand over four events between January and April 2014.  All cars used a chassis built by Paul Ceprnich of Pace Innovations in Australia, and were powered by a Chevrolet LS7 7-litre engine.

The championship consisted of only four rounds, having been reduced from the originally planned seven, as a result of a calendar realignment which will see the series run from September to April from the 2014–15 season onward. The 'sprint' component of the series was kept intact, with the 'endurance' component, which was scheduled to include events at Taupo, Pukekohe and an unconfirmed venue in the South Island, being removed from the 2014 championship and becoming the opening half of the 2014–15 championship. The opening round of the championship saw the series visit Highlands Motorsport Park for the first time.

Greg Murphy entered the season as the defending drivers' champion and claimed victory again, winning 11 of the 13 races in the championship, and scoring 1155 points. Simon Evans claimed second place with 836 points and Richard Moore achieved third place overall with 821 points.

Calendar
The 2014 V8SuperTourer season consisted of four rounds.

Teams and drivers

Event summaries

Fuchs Highlands 250

Greg Murphy dominated the opening round of the 2014 V8SuperTourer season collecting both pole positions, all three race wins and two of the three fastest laps available. One thing which was highlighted in the opening round was the lack of cars on the grid with a record low twelve cars; only ten started the final two races of the weekend. It was also the first ever SuperTourer round held at Highlands Motorsport Park, with the series running as a support category to the Toyota Racing Series. A few young drivers starred over the weekend with teenager Andre Heimgartner finishing second overall, while rookies Mark Gibson and Morgan Haber both showed great speed with Gibson eventually finishing 3rd in the final race.

The Sound Manfeild 250

Round 2 of the series was held at Manfeild Autocourse where the SuperTourers were once again running support to the Toyota Racing Series for the New Zealand Grand Prix. Greg Murphy once again took all three races for the weekend with young Simon Evans starring over the weekend keeping Murphy on his heels the whole way. Ant Pedersen returned to his 2013 pace after a disappointing round 1 but it was short lived. After claiming pole position for the opening two races, Pedersen spun at the first corner of the opening race, ruining any chance of winning. Andre Heimgartner again was very consistent leaving the meeting in second place in the championship standings, behind Murphy.

Results

The season starts in the South Island at the new Highlands Motorsport Park Track and finishes at Pukekohe Park Raceway supporting the Auckland 400 for V8 Supercars. The season was supposed to run over seven rounds but was reduced to four, after a calendar realignment which will have the next season run from September 2014 to April 2015.

Championship standings

Drivers' Championship

References

External links
 V8SuperTourers New Zealand
 V8SuperTourer News on Speedstuff

V8 Super Tourer